The Technological University (Hinthada) started as Technical High School (T.H.S) on August 1, 1977.  It was located in south of Tar Ngar Sge Quarter, Hinthada Township, Hinthada District, Ayeyarwady Division.  It was again up to Government Technological College (G.T.C).  The College was moved to the present University on April 21, 2003.

During the academic year of 2015/2016, the total numbers of students attending at TU (Hinthata) are 1500. According to the current classroom situations, there are enough rooms for the total numbers of students.

Departments

Department of Civil engineering
Department of Electronic and communication
Department of Electrical power
Department of Mechanical engineering
Academic Department

Degrees offered

 Bachelor of Engineering
 Bachelor of Technology
 Associateship of Government Technical Institute

Courses
 Civil Engineering
 Electronic and Communication Engineering
 Electrical Power Engineering
 Mechanical Engineering

See also 
List of universities in Myanmar

External links 

Technological universities in Myanmar